On My Way is a 2013 French comedy-drama film directed by Emmanuelle Bercot. The film premiered in competition at the 63rd Berlin International Film Festival.

Plot
Bettie (Deneuve), a harried restaurant owner from Brittany, is an aging former beauty queen with an estranged adult daughter and grandson and an elderly mother who meddles in her life. She loves a married businessman who always told her he would divorce his wife in order to marry her. He indeed files for a divorce, but Bettie discovers that it is actually because he is also having another affair with another much-younger woman. At about the same time, the bank threatens to close down her restaurant.

When she goes out to run some errands, she impulsively decides to leave her former life behind. She takes her car and just keeps on driving. She discovers other parts of France and makes new friends in the process.

Cast
Catherine Deneuve as Bettie
Gérard Garouste as Alan
Camille as Muriel
Mylène Demongeot as Fanfan
Claude Gensac as Annie
Paul Hamy as Marco
Hafsia Herzi as Jeanne
Valérie Lagrange as Miss Mayenne 1969
Évelyne Leclercq as Miss Champagne 1969

Reception
On My Way received generally positive reviews from critics. On Rotten Tomatoes, the film has a rating of 80% based on 41 reviews and an average rating of 6.50/10. The site's consensus reads, "While the script may not always be worthy of her gifts, Catherine Deneuve's performance ultimately offers more than enough reason to watch On My Way.". On Metacritic, the film has a score of 60 out of 100 based on 17 reviews, indicating "mixed or average reviews".

Jordan Mintzer titled his review in The Hollywood Reporter "Catherine Deneuve hits the road in this rocky third feature from actress-filmmaker Emmanuelle Bercot" and resumed On My Way (Elle s'en va) was "a film that's much more bouillabaisse than haute cuisine".

Accolades

References

External links

On My Way at Uni France films

2013 films
2010s road comedy-drama films
2010s French-language films
French road comedy-drama films
Films about beauty queens
Films directed by Emmanuelle Bercot
2010s French films